The Minister-President of the Brussels Capital-Region is the person leading the Government of the Brussels-Capital Region. The post is appointed for 5 years along with 4 ministers and 3 "state" secretaries. While being the leader of the Government, the Minister-President also is the president of the College of the Common Community Commission of Brussels.

The Minister-President of the Brussels-Capital Region should neither be confused with the Governor of Brussels-Capital nor with the mayor of the City of Brussels, which is one of the 19 municipalities of Brussels.

The Minister-President is not counted in the ratio of French-speaking to Dutch-speaking ministers.  In practice every Minister-President has been a francophone, though bilingual.

List of officeholders

Timeline

See also 
 Prime Minister of Belgium
 Minister-President of Flanders
 Minister-President of the French Community
 Minister-President of the German-speaking Community
 Minister-President of Wallonia

References

External links 
 Brussels-Capital Region. Brussels Regional Informatics Center

1989 establishments in Belgium
Brussels-Capital Region, Minister-Presidents
Brussels-related lists